70's Robot Anime Geppy-X is a 1999 Japanese video game released for the Sony PlayStation console. Developed and published by Aroma, it is a horizontally scrolling shooter set in a world that is an homage to mecha anime of the 1970s.

Plot 
The game is set in the year 197X. In the game, the protagonists use the Geppy-X giant robot to fight the invading forces of the Space Devil Empire.

Gameplay 
70s Robot Anime Geppy-X is a 2D side scrolling shooting game. Stages in the game are presented as if they were episodes of a fictitious episodic anime series named Geppy-X. Following the anime episode format, stages play the format of opening theme, Part A, eye catch, Part B, ending theme, and ending on a next episode preview. The stages even include fake commercials and its own theme music. For example, one such commercial in the game promotes a fictitious series which is a parody of Ashita no Joe, and another for merchandise related to the show such as shampoo.

The titular robot, Geppy-X, can transform into three different robot forms, each modeled after famous 70s robots.

The game only has nine actual stages despite taking up four compact discs.

Development 
The game was developed by Japanese game developer Aroma, and is an affectionate parody of mecha anime series from the 1970s, such as those created by Go Nagai. These include the Go Nagai series Grendizer, Mazinger-Z, and especially Getter Robo (which was actually created by Ken Ishikawa, a manga artist who regularly worked with Go Nagai).The game's soundtrack features Japanese singers Isao Sasaki, Akira Kushida, Hironobu Kageyama who sing the opening and ending themes songs in the game.

The game takes up a total of four compact discs, and makes heavy use of full motion video, and game music. For comparison, the game Final Fantasy VIII also used that many discs. In total, there are 8000 video clips used in the game.

 Release 
The game was released on May 27, 1999 for the Sony PlayStation and was published by the Aroma Corporation. The game was never released outside of Japan, and it has never been re-released on the PlayStation Network's Game Archives.

 Reception 
Upon release, four reviewers for Famitsu gave the game a total score of 26/40. Reviewers appreciated the thoroughness of the dedication to recreating a 1970s mecha anime in game form, including even commercials and songs. They said that anyone familiar with those series would find it rather nostalgic. Spanish gaming magazine Superjuegos'' said the game would be a rather unremarkable shooting game with graphics that looked like it came from the Super Famicom, if it weren't for the replication of a 70s anime series. The presentation was so thorough, that the author spent weeks searching on the internet to see if there was a real Geppy-X anime series. Despite that however, the writer said that there were other better shooting games for the PlayStation.

References 

1999 in video gaming
Japan-exclusive video games
Parody video games
PlayStation (console) games
PlayStation (console)-only games
Video games about mecha
Horizontally scrolling shooters
Video games developed in Japan
Video games set in the 1970s